Ludwell is a small village in south Wiltshire, England, approximately  east of the town of Shaftesbury, Dorset. It lies within the Cranborne Chase and West Wiltshire Downs Area of Outstanding Natural Beauty. The village is on the A30 Salisbury-Shaftesbury road.

For the purposes of local government, Ludwell is part of Donhead St Mary civil parish.

Peckons Hill, Birdbush and Brook Waters are neighbouring hamlets to the northeast of Ludwell, along the A30 towards Ansty and Swallowcliffe.

The village has a primary school which was established in 1875, and an Anglican church, St John the Baptist, built in 1839 in Neo-Norman style with a two-tower west facade.

Notable buildings are Ludwell Stores & Post Office, a late 18th-century house with attached former bakery; and the Grove Arms public house, from the early 17th century with additions in the early 18th and 19th. Other businesses include T. Buttlings traditional butchers and Greenacre farm shop.

References

External links

 

Villages in Wiltshire